Agnieszka Maria Kołacz-Leszczyńska (born 19 October 1972) is a Polish politician. Between 2006-2011 she was chairwoman of the city council in Wałbrzych. She was elected to the Sejm in 2011 and 2015, 
and to the Senate of Poland in October 2019.

References

1972 births
Living people
Members of the Polish Sejm 2011–2015
Members of the Polish Sejm 2015–2019
Members of the Senate of Poland 2019–2023